Rush Hour is a sketch show made by Zeppotron and shown on BBC Three during March and April 2007. The show featured several sketches centred on characters travelling to work, school or otherwise, therefore many of the sketches took place inside a car or bus. Several cult and up and coming comedians and comic actors star in the show, each performing several of the characters. The cast includes Adam Buxton, Sanjeev Kohli, Miranda Hart, Frankie Boyle, David Armand, Marek Larwood, Kerry Godliman, Bruce Mackinnon, Naomi Bentley, Lorna Watson, and Katy Wix.

BBC Three didn't recommission the show for a second series due to bad reviews.

External links
 

2000s British television sketch shows
2007 British television series debuts
2007 British television series endings
BBC television comedy
BBC television sketch shows
Television series created by Charlie Brooker
Television series by Endemol
Television series by Zeppotron